John Roberts Opel (January 5, 1925, in Kansas City, Missouri – November 3, 2011, in Fort Myers, Florida) was a U.S. computer businessman. He served eleven years as the President of IBM between 1974 and 1985. He was the chief executive officer (CEO) of IBM from 1981 to 1985, and the Chairman of the board of directors from 1983 to 1986.

Early life and education

Born in Kansas City, Missouri, Opel grew up in Jefferson City, Missouri where his father owned a hardware store. He majored in English at Westminster College in Fulton, Missouri. He then fought in the Philippines and Okinawa in World War II and earned an MBA degree from the University of Chicago in 1949.

Career
Upon graduation, Opel had two job offers, one to rewrite economics textbooks, and the other to take over his father's hardware business. While taking a fishing trip with his father and a family friend who worked for IBM, he was offered a third job as a salesman in central Missouri, and accepted.

In 1959, Opel became executive assistant to IBM CEO Thomas J. Watson Jr., after which he rose rapidly, taking positions in manufacturing and public relations and other departments, and managed the introduction of the IBM System/360 mainframe computer in 1964. In 1974, he was elected president. In 1981, he became the CEO of IBM, then its chairman.

Under his leadership, IBM developed and launched the first IBM personal computer, forever changing the face of computing and IBM.

Death

A former long time resident of Chappaqua, New York, Opel died at the age of 86 at his Fort Myers, Florida home in 2011.

External links
The Colossus That Works - 1983 Time Cover story

References

1925 births
2011 deaths
IBM employees
American technology chief executives
University of Chicago Booth School of Business alumni
American chief executives of Fortune 500 companies
20th-century American businesspeople
Westminster College (Missouri) alumni
Businesspeople from Missouri
American computer businesspeople